The 1978–79 Duke Blue Devils men's basketball team represented Duke University during the 1978–79 college basketball season.

Roster

Compiled from multiple sources

Schedule

|-
!colspan=9 style=| ACC Tournament

|-
!colspan=9 style=| NCAA tournament

Compiled from multiple sources

Rankings

^Coaches did not release Week 1 or Week 2 polls.

References

External links
 
 1978–79 Duke Blue Devils on Sports Reference

Duke Blue Devils men's basketball seasons
Duke
1978 in sports in North Carolina
1979 in sports in North Carolina
Duke